Richard of Shrewsbury, Duke of York (17 August 1473), was the sixth child and second son of King Edward IV of England and Elizabeth Woodville, born in Shrewsbury. Richard and his older brother, who briefly reigned as King Edward V of England, mysteriously disappeared shortly after Richard III became king in 1483.

Dukedoms

Prince Richard was created Duke of York in May 1474 and made a Knight of the Garter the following year. From this time on, it became a tradition for the second son of the English sovereign to be Duke of York. He was created Earl of Nottingham on 12 June 1476. On 15 January 1478, in St Stephen's Chapel, Westminster, when he was 4 years old, he married the 5-year-old Anne de Mowbray, 8th Countess of Norfolk, who had inherited the vast Mowbray estates in 1476. 

As York's father-in-law's dukedom had become extinct when Anne could not inherit it, he was created Duke of Norfolk and Earl Warenne on 7 February 1477. When Anne de Mowbray died in November 1481 her estates should have passed to William, Viscount Berkeley and to John, Lord Howard. 

In January 1483, Parliament passed an act that gave the Mowbray estates to Richard, Duke of York and Norfolk, for his lifetime, and at his death to his heirs, if he had any. The rights of the two co-heirs at law were extinguished; Viscount Berkeley had financial difficulties and King Edward IV paid off and forgave those debts. Berkeley then renounced his claims to the Mowbray estate before parliament in 1483. Nothing was done for Lord Howard.

Heir presumptive

His father died on 9 April 1483. Thus his brother Edward, Prince of Wales, became King of England and was acclaimed as such, and Richard his Heir Presumptive. This was not to last. A priest, now generally believed to have been Robert Stillington, the Bishop of Bath and Wells, testified that Edward IV had agreed to marry Lady Eleanor Talbot in 1461. Lady Eleanor was still alive when Edward married Elizabeth Woodville in 1464. The Regency Council under the late King's brother Richard, Duke of Gloucester, concluded that this was a case of bigamy, invalidating the second marriage and the legitimacy of all children of Edward IV by this marriage. Under Gloucester's influence, both Edward and Richard were declared illegitimate and removed from the line of succession on 25 June 1483. The Duke of Gloucester, as the only surviving brother of Edward IV, became King Richard III.

Possible fate

The Duke of York was sent to the Tower of London, then a royal residence, by King Richard III in mid-1483, where he was held with his brother. They were sometimes seen in the garden of the Tower, but there are no known sightings of them after the summer of 1483. What happened to the two of them—the Princes in the Tower—after their disappearance remains unknown. Tudor History was quick to blame his uncle, Richard. 

Thomas More wrote that the princes were smothered to death with their pillows, and his account forms the basis of William Shakespeare's play Richard III, in which Tyrrell suborns Forrest and Dighton to murder the princes on Richard's orders. Subsequent re-evaluations of Richard III have questioned his guilt, beginning with William Cornwallis early in the 17th century.

In the period before the boys' disappearance, Edward was regularly being visited by a doctor; historian David Baldwin extrapolates that contemporaries may have believed Edward had died either of an illness or as the result of attempts to cure him. 

In the absence of hard evidence a number of other theories have been put forward, of which the most widely discussed are that they were murdered on the orders of the Duke of Buckingham or by Henry Tudor, Earl of Richmond (later King Henry VII). Bones reportedly belonging to two children were discovered in 1674 by workmen rebuilding a stairway in the Tower. On the orders of King Charles II, these were subsequently placed in Westminster Abbey, in an urn bearing the names of Edward and Richard. 

The bones were re-examined in 1933 at which time it was discovered the skeletons were incomplete and had been interred with animal bones. It has never been proven that the bones belonged to the princes.

In 1789, workmen carrying out repairs in St George's Chapel, Windsor, rediscovered and accidentally broke into the vault of Edward IV and Elizabeth Woodville. Adjoining this was another vault, which was found to contain the coffins of two children. This tomb was inscribed with the names of two of Edward IV's children: George, Duke of Bedford, who had died at the age of two; and Mary of York who had died at the age of 14. Both had predeceased the King. However, the remains of these two children were later found elsewhere in the chapel, leaving the occupants of the children's coffins within the tomb unknown.

In 1486, Richard of Shrewsbury's eldest sister Elizabeth married Henry VII, thereby uniting the Houses of York and Lancaster.

Perkin Warbeck

In 1491, in Cork, Perkin Warbeck, a young man of Flemish origin was proclaimed by a variety of Yorkist supporters led by the Irish city's former Mayor John Atwater to be Richard. He claimed to have escaped from the Tower and spent the intervening years on the run. Over the next six years, Warbeck travelled across Europe, receiving recognition from a number of monarchs including Maximilian I, Holy Roman Emperor and James IV of Scotland as "Richard IV" of England. This support included Margaret of York, the aunt of the real Richard. Following his capture after a failed invasion of England in 1497, Warbeck was held in the Tower of London. He confessed to being an impostor, and was later executed following an attempt to escape.

Arms

As son of the king, Richard was granted use of the arms of the kingdom, differentiated by a label argent, on the first point a canton gules.

See also
List of people who disappeared

Ancestry

References

 page 218

 page 248

1473 births
1480s missing person cases
15th-century English nobility
Children of Edward IV of England
Disappeared princes
201
Dukes of York
Earls Marshal
1st Earl of Norfolk
301
Edward V of England
Heirs to the English throne
Richard of Shrewsbury
Lords Lieutenant of Ireland
Missing person cases in England
Knights of the Bath
Knights of the Garter
People from Shrewsbury
Prisoners in the Tower of London
Royalty and nobility who died as children
Sons of kings